5-MeS-DMT (5-methylthio-N,N-dimethyltryptamine) is a lesser-known psychedelic drug.  It is the 5-methylthio analog of dimethyltryptamine (DMT). 5-MeS-DMT was first synthesized by Alexander Shulgin. In his book TiHKAL (Tryptamines I Have Known and Loved), the minimum dosage is listed as 15-30 mg. The duration listed as very short (less than one hour), just like DMT. 5-MeS-DMT produces similar effects to DMT, but weaker.  Shulgin describes his feelings while on a low dose of this drug as "pointlessly stoned", although at a higher dose of 20 mg he says it is "quite intense" and suggests that a higher dose still might have full activity.

5-MeS-DMT has been the subject of only limited clinical testing, with several small behavioral studies in rats indicating that it is a less potent than 5-MeO-DMT or 4-hydroxy-DMT (psilocin) but more effective than either 4-MeO-DMT or 4-MeS-DMT.

See also 
 Tryptamine
 Psychedelics, dissociatives and deliriants

References

Psychedelic tryptamines
Thioethers